The 33 Strategies of War was written by American author Robert Greene in 2006. It is composed of discussions and examples of offensive and defensive strategies from a wide variety of people and conditions, applying them to social conflicts such as family quarrels and business negotiations.

Reception 
The Independent said Greene has set himself up as "a modern-day Machiavelli" but that "it is never clear whether he really believes what he writes or whether it is just his shtick, an instrument of his will to shift £20 hardbacks" and concludes "There is something less than adult about it all." Admiral James G. Stavridis said the book had good breadth, but it lacked depth. Leadership theorist and author John Adair said Greene "shows a poor grasp of the subject" and the book is based on the flawed "assumption that the art of military strategy and the art of living are comparable". Booklist said the book was repetitive, lacked a sense of humor, and had an annoying "quasi-spiritual tone". NBA player Chris Bosh stated that his favorite book is The 33 Strategies of War. 
The 33 Strategies of War was part of the reading list for youths attending the Indigenous Leadership Forum organised by the University of Victoria, which aimed to redesign radical Indigenous politics and the Indigenist movement. It is also read by students attending a Southwestern Baptist Theological Seminary course in Christian apologetics.  The book has been banned by several US prisons.

In the book Greene writes that "Afghanistan was rich in natural gas and other minerals and had ports on the Indian Ocean": Afghanistan is land-locked. (Trade to and from Afghanistan uses ports in other countries, such as Chabahar Port in Iran.) The political tales in the book are said to be "mostly foolish or just plain wrong".

The book has been described by reviewers as having "far too many duff sentences", such: "Your goal is to blend philosophy and war, wisdom and battle, into an unbeatable blend."

It has sold more than 200,000 copies.

See also 
 On War
 The Art of War
 The Book of Five Rings
 Thirty-Six Stratagems

References

External links
33 Strategies of War interview featuring Robert Greene

2006 non-fiction books
Self-help books
Books by Robert Greene (American author)